Félix Franco-Oppenheimer (August 10, 1912 – September 25, 2004) was a Puerto Rican poet and writer. His works include Contornos, Imagen y visión edénica de Puerto Rico, and Antología poética.

First years
Franco-Oppenheimer was born in Ponce, Puerto Rico in 1912.

Death
He died in San Juan, Puerto Rico, on September 25, 2004.

Honors
Franco-Oppenheimer is honored at Ponce's Park of Illustrious Ponce Citizens for his contributions in the field of literature.

See also

 List of Puerto Ricans

References

1912 births
2004 deaths
Writers from Ponce